The Singapore women's national beach handball team is the national team of Singapore. It is governed by the Handball Federation Singapore and takes part in international beach handball competitions.

World Championships results
 2012 – 12th place

External links
Official website
IHF profile

Women's national beach handball teams
beach